Hirtaeschopalaea nubila is a species of beetle in the family Cerambycidae. It was described by Masaki Matsushita in 1933, originally under the genus Jezohammus.

References

Lamiinae
Beetles described in 1933